Ji'Ayir A'Veon Brown (born January 25, 2000) is an American football safety for the Penn State Nittany Lions.

Early life and high school career
Brown was born on January 25, 2000, in Trenton, New Jersey. He attended and played high school football for Trenton Central High School in Trenton, New Jersey.

College career

Lackawanna College 
Brown attended Lackawanna College in 2018 and 2019. In 2019, he was the Northeast JC Football Conference Defensive Player of the Year.

Penn State 
In 2020, Brown transferred to Penn State University. After spending his first year in 2020 as a backup, he took over as a starter in 2021. In 13 starts, he had 73 tackles, six interceptions and one touchdown. Brown returned to Penn State in 2022. He was named the defensive MVP of the 2023 Rose Bowl.

References

External links
 
 Penn State Nittany Lions bio

Living people
Players of American football from Trenton, New Jersey
American football safeties
Lackawanna Falcons football players
Penn State Nittany Lions football players
Trenton Central High School alumni
2000 births